Alfred Edward Maitland (8 October 1895 – 1981) was a Scottish professional footballer who made over 330 appearances in the Football League for Newcastle United, South Shields and Middlesbrough as a full back.

Personal life 
Maitland served in the Royal Air Force during the First World War.

Career statistics

Honours 
Newcastle United

 Football League First Division: 1926–27

References 

English Football League players

Place of death missing
Scottish footballers
Newcastle United F.C. players
1895 births
1981 deaths
People from Leith
Association football fullbacks
Royal Air Force personnel of World War I
Leith Athletic F.C. players
South Shields F.C. (1889) players
Middlesbrough F.C. players
Jarrow F.C. players
Ebbsfleet United F.C. players
Leamington F.C. players
English Football League representative players
Salisbury City F.C. (1905) players
Scottish football managers
Footballers from Edinburgh